Giancarlo Falappa (born 30 June 1963) is an Italian former professional motorcycle road racer. He was nicknamed the Lion of Jesi because of his fearsome riding style.

Motorcycle racing career
Falappa was born in Filottrano in the Province of Ancona and then moved to Jesi with his family. He began his racing career in motocross before making the switch to road racing in 1988. In  he moved up to the Superbike World Championship riding for Bimota, winning 3 races and finishing the season in sixth place. His best result was a 4th-place finish in the  season and a 5th place in the  season (winning 7 races, including the season's first 3).

In , Falappa crashed while testing a factory Ducati 916 and suffered serious head injuries. After being in a lengthy coma, he eventually recovered, but never raced again. He won a total of 16 races in his Superbike World Championship career.

Career statistics

Superbike World Championship

Races by year
(key) (Races in bold indicate pole position) (Races in italics indicate fastest lap)

References

1963 births
Living people
People from Iesi
Italian motorcycle racers
Superbike World Championship riders
Sportspeople from the Province of Ancona